The Lincoln Park Grounds, commonly known as Union Grounds, was a former baseball park, part of Lincoln Park, located in Cincinnati, Ohio. The Grounds were built for the Union Cricket Club in 1856; they "were used for cricket and baseball in the summer and were flooded for skating in the winter." In 1865 Harry Wright became the professional of the Cincinnati Cricket Club, which also used the grounds, and the next year Aaron Champion, president of the new Cincinnati Base Ball Club, "approached Wright to propose a limited use of the grounds if the CBBC and Live Oaks club would put in $2000 each to revamp the Lincoln Park Grounds."
A year later the [Red Stockings] leased the grounds of the Union Cricket Club for its home
tilts. Most club members referred to the field as the Union Grounds, although it also was known as the Union Cricket Club Grounds and the Lincoln Park Grounds, given the fact that the eight-acre, fenced grounds were located in a small park behind Lincoln Park in Cincinnati, near the Union Terminal. It was a twenty-minute ride by streetcar to the Union Grounds from the heart of downtown Cincinnati. Aaron Champion ordered that approximately $10,000 worth of improvements be made to the home grounds for the 1867 season, including grading and sodding of the field and building of a new clubhouse and stands.

Lincoln Park was bounded by Kenner Street (north); Freeman Avenue (east); Hopkins Street (south); and Hoefer Street (west). Old maps show the western one-third of the park designated as "ball field".

The ballpark hosted three National Association games in the spring and summer of 1871. One of them was held on July 4, featuring the Boston Red Stockings as the "visitors" and the Washington Olympics as the "home" team. Those were the two clubs that most of the 1869-70 Cincinnati Red Stockings players had joined when the Cincinnati club disbanded after the 1870 season. The previous day, those former members of the Red Stockings had played an exhibition game against the other members of the Boston and Olympic clubs, advertised as the "Old Reds" against a "picked nine". The "picked nine" won the game 15-13.(Cincinnati Enquirer, July 4, 1871, p. 4)

The Union Grounds were used until 1875; the next year a new Cincinnati Red Stockings  club played at the Avenue Grounds two miles to the north.

Lincoln Park itself was eventually closed and its property became the site of the Cincinnati Union Terminal.

References

Defunct baseball venues in the United States
Defunct college football venues
Cincinnati Bearcats football
Sports venues in Cincinnati
Baseball in Cincinnati
Baseball venues in Ohio
Cricket grounds in the United States
Sports venues completed in 1856
Defunct cricket grounds
Cincinnati Union Terminal